Sam Christian Palladio Scott (born 21 November 1986) is an English actor and musician. He is best known for his starring role as Gunnar Scott in the ABC musical drama series Nashville (2012–18). Palladio has also had recurring roles on the comedy series Episodes (2012–15) and the science fiction series Humans (2015–2018). His feature film credits include 7 Lives (2011), Runner, Runner (2013), Strange Magic (2015), The Princess Switch (2018), The Princess Switch: Switched Again (2020) and The Princess Switch 3: Romancing the Star (2021).

Early life
Palladio was born in Pembury, Kent, England, UK. He was brought up by his parents, who are both artists, in Penzance, Cornwall, England. Palladio was educated at Humphry Davy School and then studied Actor Musicianship at Rose Bruford College in Sidcup, London, graduating in 2008.

Career
Palladio began his career with guest starring roles in various television series, including Little Crackers, Doctors, The Hour, and Cardinal Burns. He gained further recognition for his starring role as Gunnar Scott in the ABC musical drama series Nashville. The series premiered to critical acclaim in 2012. It ended its run after six seasons in 2018. He also had a recurring role as Stoke on the comedy series Episodes between 2012 and 2015. Since 2016, he has had a recurring role as Ed in the science fiction drama series Humans.

His film credits include roles as Calvin in the British drama film 7 Lives (2011), as Shecky in the crime thriller film Runner, Runner (2013), and as Roland in the animated musical fantasy film Strange Magic (2015). He was also the lead singer in a band called Salt Water Thief. In 2020, he appeared on an episode of The Repair Shop, receiving his grandfather's RAF cap after it had been restored by the programme's experts.

Filmography

Film

Television

Discography

Singles

Other appearances

Explanatory notes

References

External links

 

1986 births
21st-century English male actors
Alumni of Rose Bruford College
English expatriates in the United States
English male film actors
English male television actors
Living people
People from Penzance
People from Pembury